The Raid is a 1954 American Western film set during the American Civil War. It stars Van Heflin, Anne Bancroft, Richard Boone and Lee Marvin. It is loosely based on a true incident, the St. Albans Raid, as well as the book by Herbert Ravenal Sass. However the film made a significant change, turning the raid into an act of revenge for William Tecumseh Sherman's burning of Atlanta.

Plot
In 1864 during the American Civil War, a group of Confederate prisoners held in a Union prison stockade at Plattsburgh, New York, not many miles from the Canada–US border, escape. They head for Montréal, Quebec and then plan a raid across the border into St. Albans, Vermont, to rob its banks to replenish the Confederate treasury and burn buildings as revenge for Sherman's March to the Sea and to tie up the Union forces.

Major Neal Benton (Van Heflin), the leader of the raid, heads into St. Albans as a spy and develops ambiguous feelings about what he is doing when he becomes friends with an attractive young war widow and her friendly son, who he boards with, masquerading as a Canadian businessman. Other raiders stay in an abandoned barn or pose as travelling street peddlers. One drunken member interrupts a church service and is promptly shot dead by Benton, the raid leader, almost giving away the plot. The townspeople shower Benton with gratitude for this, not realizing his own true identity.

On the appointed day, Major Benton in town, and the other raiders at the barn, all don Confederate uniforms, take some citizens hostage, rob the bank's strongbox at gunpoint, burn down the town hall, and gallop north just ahead of an arriving Union force. Burning a bridge behind them, they barely elude the Union forces and make a successful getaway to nearby Canada.

Cast
 Van Heflin as Maj. Neal Benton 
 Anne Bancroft as Katie Bishop
 Richard Boone as Capt. Lionel Foster
 Lee Marvin as Lt. Keating
 Tommy Rettig as Larry Bishop
 Peter Graves as Capt. Frank Dwyer
 Douglas Spencer as Rev. Lucas
 Paul Cavanagh as Col. Tucker
 Will Wright as Josiah Anderson
 James Best as Lt. Robinson
 John Dierkes as Cpl. Fred Deane
 Helen Ford as Delphine Coates
 Dolores Fuller

Trivia

In the 18 January 1959 episode of the game show What's My Line?, Van Heflin the guest panellist, mentioned that Boone stole his movie from him, which the celebrity guest demurred.

This movie utilized the same set as the Andy Griffith Show used. Josiah’s Bank was the exterior of the Mayberry courthouse.

The version of this film was aired on the Fox Movie Channel and has a squeezed CinemaScope logo tacked in the beginning, however, the film was shot "flat" and is shown open-matte at an aspect ratio of 1.37:1.

References

External links
 
 
 
 

1954 films
1954 Western (genre) films
1950s war drama films
American Civil War films
American war drama films
Films based on American novels
Films directed by Hugo Fregonese
Films scored by Roy Webb
20th Century Fox films
Films set in Vermont
1954 drama films
1950s English-language films
1950s American films